The Northern Sea Route (NSR) (Severnyy morskoy put, shortened to Севморпуть, Sevmorput) is a shipping route officially defined by Russian legislation as lying east of Novaya Zemlya and specifically running along the Russian Arctic coast from the Kara Sea, along Siberia, to the Bering Strait. 

To be more precise, The Northern Sea Route crosses the seas of the Arctic Ocean (Kara Sea, Laptev Sea, East Siberian Sea, and Chukchi Sea). Administratively, in the west the NSR is bounded by the western entrances to the Novaya Zemlya straits and by the meridian running north from Cape Zhelaniya, and in the east, in the Bering Strait, it is bounded by the parallel of 66 ° N and the meridian of 168 ° 58′37 ″ W.

The entire route lies in Arctic waters and within Russia's exclusive economic zone (EEZ). Parts are free of ice for only two months per year. The overall route on Russia's side of the Arctic between North Cape and the Bering Strait has been called the Northeast Passage, analogous to the Northwest Passage on the Canada side.

The length of the Northern Sea Route from the Kara Gates to Provideniya Bay is about 5600 km. The distance from St. Petersburg to Vladivostok through the NSR is over 14 thousand km (for comparison, the same distance through the Suez Canal is over 23 thousand km). The Northern Sea Route serves the Arctic ports and major rivers of Siberia by importing fuel, equipment, food and exporting timber and minerals. The Suez or Panama Canal are the alternatives to the Northern Sea Route. However, if the distance from the port of Murmansk (Russia) to the port of Yokohama (Japan) through the Suez Canal is 12,840 nautical miles, the same itinerary along the Northern Sea Route equals only 5,770 nautical miles.

While the Northeast Passage includes all the East Arctic seas and connects the Atlantic and Pacific oceans, the Northern Sea Route does not include the Barents Sea, and it therefore does not reach the Atlantic.

Melting Arctic ice caps are likely to increase traffic in and the commercial viability of the Northern Sea Route. One study, for instance, projects "remarkable shifts in trade flows between Asia and Europe, diversion of trade within Europe, heavy shipping traffic in the Arctic and a substantial drop in Suez traffic. Projected shifts in trade also imply substantial pressure on an already threatened Arctic ecosystem."

However, a polar opinion also does exist. The Northern Sea route is considerably shorter than the existing sea routes from Asia to Europe, which makes it more ecological due to less consumption of CO2. A usable Northern Sea Route between northern Europe and North Pacific ports would cut time at sea (and, accordingly, fuel consumption) by more than half. For the corporate players in bulk shipping of relatively low-value raw materials, cost savings for fuel may appear as a driver to explore the Northern Sea Route for commercial transits, and not necessarily reduced lead time. The Northern Sea Route allows economies of scale compared to coastal route alternatives, with vessel draught and beam limitation. Environmental demands faced by the maritime shipping industry may emerge as a driver for developing the Northern Sea Route.

There are also new opportunities for tourism.  It was reported in 2023 that Rosmorport, a state-owned agency of the Russian Ministry of Transport, has plans to run cruises for tourists in icebreakers along the entire Northern Sea Route between Murmansk and Vladivostok. 

According to the Fourth IMO GHG Study 2020, sea cargo transportation is responsible for 2.9% of global emissions. More than that, in the next 20 years the trading maritime volume is expected to double, which may cause even worse consequences for the environment. Now marine transport produces about 1 gigaton of carbon dioxide (CO2) emissions per year and has been struggling for many years to reduce its environmental impact. For example, the International Maritime Organization (IMO) has obliged sea carriers to reduce CO2 emissions by 50% by 2050. It may seem very realistic, but achieving this result may become a tough challenge. Firstly, marine transport generates 14% of all transport emissions, and, secondly, effective techniques that could replace marine engines powered by fossil fuels do not exist yet. Due to its shorter length, navigation on the NSR contributes to reducing the carbon footprint of maritime transport thus contributing to the achievement of the Paris Agreement goals.

History

The route was first conquered by Adolf Erik Nordenskiöld's  expedition with a single wintering in 1878–79.

The Northern Sea Route is one of several Arctic shipping routes. Since the mid-1930s the Northern Sea Route has been an officially managed and administered shipping route along the northern/Arctic coast of Russia. A convoy of seven merchant brand new vessels (900 DWT to 5500 DWT) built for People's Republic of China but under Polish flag from Gdynia with the assistance of Soviet icebreakers reached port of Pevek (via Kara Gates, Vilkitsky, Dmitry Laptev and Sannikov Straits), two days of navigation before Bering Strait in 1956. The administrative entity was sequentially updated, upgraded, and renamed. Its current incarnation was the Federal State Budgetary Institution's establishment of The Northern Sea Route Administration in 2013.

Two-thirds of the Arctic seas remain ice-free in summer, that is why ships have more route options. In August 2017, the first ship traversed the Northern Sea Route without the use of icebreakers. According to the New York Times, this forebodes more shipping through the Arctic, as the sea ice melts and makes shipping easier. In 2018 Maersk Line sent the new "ice-class" container ship Venta Maersk through the route to gather data on operational feasibility, though they did not currently see it as commercially attractive. Escort assistance was required for three days from the Russian nuclear-powered icebreaker .

The Dutch Bureau for Economic Policy Analysis projected in 2015 that the Northern Sea Route may be ice-free by 2030, earlier than the Northwest Passage or Transpolar Sea Route. A 2016 report by the Copenhagen Business School found that large-scale trans-Arctic shipping may become economically viable by 2040.

As the Northern Sea Route is a strategically important transport artery, it can already be called economically profitable in comparison, for example, with the Suez Canal due to a number of reasons:
Fuel savings due to reduced distance;
The shorter distance reduces the cost of staff labor and chartering vessels;
The Northern Sea Route does not charge payments for the passage (unlike, for example, the Suez Canal);
There are no queues (unlike, for example, the Suez Canal);
There is no risk of a pirate attack.

In 2018 the Russian government transferred the main responsibility for the Northern Sea Route to Rosatom which through its ROSATOMFLOT subsidiary manages the Russian nuclear powered icebreaker fleet based in Murmansk.

Rosatom is a state corporation that organizes the navigation of vessels in the waters of the NSR in accordance with the Merchant Shipping Code, manages a fleet of powerful nuclear icebreakers, ensures the safety and uninterrupted operation of navigation, provides port services for gas tankers in case of unfavorable weather conditions. Rosatom also provides navigation and hydrographic support in the waters of the Northern Sea Route, develops the infrastructure of sea harbors, and manages the state property of these ports. For this purpose, the Directorate of the Northern Sea Route was formed, that now manages three subordinate organizations "Atomflot" (ROSATOMFLOT), "Hydrographic Enterprise" and "ChukotAtomEnergo".

Recently, the "Main Directorate of the Northern Sea Route" ("Glavsevmorput") was established on the basis of the Naval Operations Headquarters of FSUE “Atomflot”. The main purpose of the creation of the Glavsevmorput is to organize the navigation of vessels in the waters of the Northern Sea Route. Glavsevmorput Federal State Budgetary Institution solves the following tasks: ensuring the organization of icebreaking vessels taking into account the hydrometeorological, ice, and navigation conditions in the waters of the NSR; vessels navigation in the waters of the NSR; issuance, suspension, renewal, and termination of permits for sailing vessels in the waters of the NSR. To solve these tasks, the department arranges icebreaker fleet vessels in the waters of the NSR, monitors the traffic in the NSR water area, provides information on hydrometeorological, ice, and navigation conditions, and processes information from vessels located in the NSR water area. Rosatom is a Legacy Member of the Arctic Economic Council, that’s why all the operations are aimed to establish economic well-being, environmental neutrality, and human capital development. 

Since 2008, the structure of Rosatom includes the Russian nuclear icebreaker fleet, which is the largest in the world with a container ship, four service vessels and seven nuclear-powered icebreakers (“Yamal”, "50 Let Pobedy", "Taymyr", "Vaygach", "Arctic", "Siberia" and "Ural"). The last three are the latest universal icebreakers of the 22220 project, and the world's only transport vessel with the Sevmorput nuclear power plant in operation.

As the development of the icebreaking fleet is the most important condition for constant navigation in Arctic waters, other two universal nuclear icebreakers of project 22220 are currently being built in St. Petersburg. They are Yakutiya (2024) and Chukotka (2026). These icebreakers will be universal, which means they will be able to change the draft from 10.5 to 8.1 meters, depending on the depth, which will allow them to work both at sea and in the mouths of Siberian rivers. They will be equipped with a power plant with two RITM-200 reactors and will be capable of overcoming ice up to 3 meters thick. At the same time, the 5th and 6th icebreakers of the 22220 project are planned to be constructed as well as 4 non-nuclear icebreakers to serve shippers' investment projects.

In addition, the Zvezda shipyard is working on the construction of the world's most powerful nuclear icebreaker project 10510 "Russia", scheduled to commissioning in 2027. It is also planned to build two more icebreakers of this prototype. These icebreakers will be equipped with a two-reactor power plant with RITM-400 reactors with a capacity of 315 MW. The maximum ice thickness overcome by these icebreakers will exceed 4 meters.

Economic assessment 
Researchers and economists usually compare the Northern Sea Route with the conventional Suez Canal Route. The first route is shorter, which allow to save on fuel, but it is connected with environmental risks and increased operating costs. 

However, the above-mentioned research can be considered disputable and incomplete, as it does not consider such factors like the reduced length of the Northern Sea Route (comparing to the Suez Canal) and, therefore, reduced CO2 emissions; the absence of charge payments for the passage; no risks of a pirate attack and, accordingly, no need to insure the cargo; the reduced cost of journey due to its reduced length.

Some studies recommend the joint usage of the two routes where the Northern Sea Route is used in summer when it is almost ice-free, and the Suez Canal Route is sailed in the rest of the year. The researchers also claim that the economic feasibility of the NSR largely depends on its weather conditions. 

Even though the Arctic ice is melting and Polar routes are being extensively studied, the amount of cargo shipped through the Northern Sea Route (NSR) remains low in comparison to the Suez Canal. Though, the cargo traffic is steadily growing every year. The research shows that the NSR-SCR combined shipping scheme can be more competitive than the use of the Suez Canal Route only. If the shipping company provides sufficient loading on the NSR, uses a reliable ice-class vessel for navigation and the price of crude oil is high, the economic advantage of the NSR-SCR combined shipping scheme is obvious. Ice thickness directly affects the shipping cost. Now, when the Arctic ice is slowly melting due to weather conditions, the cost of icebreaking service is expected to reduce. Also, vessels of some ice classes can sail on the NSR independently. That is why the NSR icebreaker escort fee may be several times lower than the SCR toll.

State Corporation Rosatom assumes the possibility and functions of the NSR and ensures the safety of navigation on the high technological level. Besides organizing the navigation along the NSR and the icebreaking services with the world's only nuclear icebreaker fleet, Rosatom is planning to implement the Arctic Ice Regime Shipping System (AIRSS) methodology. This system will represent a digital space that will provide various services to cargo carriers, shipowners, captains, insurers, and other participants in the logistics market on the NSR. In particular, it involves issuing permits for the passage of vessels, monitoring, dispatching, and managing the work of the fleet. The single digital platform will collect information from all the available sources, for example, hydrometeorological data, the location of ships and icebreakers, port congestion. As a result, users will receive an advanced "ice navigator" that will allow to plot a precise route in view of the changing ice conditions of the NSR. In other words, the study of Sibul et al. proposed a path-finding algorithm for the NSR strategic assessment. It uses real weather as input and find the optimal shipping route.

Economic effects
Number of complete through transits per flag state.

In 2021 a record number of transit voyages used the Northern Sea Route. 85 ships (among which only 12 voyages were made by vessels under the Russian flag) passed the NSR with around 2.75m tons of cargo.

See also 

 Arctic Bridge
 Arctic cooperation and politics
 Arctic policy of Russia
 List of Russian explorers
 Territorial claims in the Arctic

Notes

References

Further reading
 
 
Zeng et al. 2020. "The competitiveness of Arctic shipping over Suez Canal and China-Europe railway." Transport Policy. 
Wang et al. 2020. "Development situation and future demand for the ports along the Northern Sea Route."  Research in Transportation Business & Management
Ding et al. 2020. "Does a carbon tax affect the feasibility of Arctic shipping?"  Transportation Research Part D: Transport and Environment

External links
 Northern Sea Route Administration (Russian Federation)
 Northern Sea Route Information Office (Nord University)
 International Northern Sea Route Programme
 Russian State Museum of the Arctic and Antarctic, The discovery and history of exploration of the Northern Sea Route
 Pictures - during NE passage
Tanker Vladimir Tikhonov Completes Successful Northern Sea Route Transit in a Week
 Armstrong, Terence. The Northern Sea Route (Cambridge: Cambridge University Press, 1952)
 Belov, M. I. Istoriia otkrytiia i osveniia Severnogo Morskogo Puti, 4 vols. (Leningrad, 1956–1969)
 Horensma, Piers. The Soviet Arctic (London: Routledge, 1991)
 McCannon, John. Red Arctic (New York: Oxford University Press, 1998)
 Konyshev, Valery & Sergunin, Alexander: Is Russia a revisionist military power in the Arctic? Defense & Security Analysis, September 2014.
 Konyshev, Valery & Sergunin, Alexander. Russia in search of its Arctic strategy: between hard and soft power? Polar Journal, April 2014.

Arctic Ocean
Chukchi Sea
East Siberian Sea
Geography of Russia
Kara Sea
Laptev Sea
Navigation
Polar exploration by Russia and the Soviet Union
Sea lanes
Transport in the Arctic
Water transport in Russia
Foreign trade of the Soviet Union
Federal law enforcement agencies of Russia